Oharu may refer to:

Ōharu, Aichi, a place in Japan
The Life of Oharu, a film